Scythris subsiccella is a moth of the family Scythrididae. It was described by Bengt Å. Bengtsson in 1997. It is found in France.

Etymology
The species name refers to the close external similarity to Scythris siccella, plus Latin sub- (meaning near).

References

subsiccella
Moths described in 1997